The 1967–68 Minnesota Muskies season was the first and only season of the Muskies in the newly created American Basketball Association. The team was created on February 2, 1967 for the price of $30,000 to L.P. Shields and Fred Jefferson. The team was named after a nickname for the Muskellunge, which is a fish found in Minnesota. The team did well on the court, finishing 2nd to the Pipers in the Eastern Division. In the playoffs, they made it to the Division Finals, but the Muskies lost in 5 games to the Pipers. However, this proved to be the only season for the Muskies due to losing money (reportedly $400,000) with middling attendance with minimal season tickets purchased (In the five playoff games played in Minnesota, they averaged 3,511 in attendance, with the highest being 8,357 for Game 3 of the Division Finals and the lowest being 661 for Game 1 of the Semifinals). A plan to play 9 games of next season in places around Minnesota and a television contract were curtailed, and the Muskies moved to Miami on May 24, 1968. However, basketball in Minnesota would not be curtailed for long, as the Pittsburgh Pipers moved to play in the same location

Roster
 23 Richard Clark – Point guard	
 34 Mel Daniels – Center
 20 Donnie Freeman – Shooting guard	
 35 Les Hunter – Power forward	
 24 Ervin Inniger – Shooting guard	
 51 Gary Keller – Power forward	
 33 Terry Kunze – Shooting guard
 32 Errol Palmer – Small forward	
 22 Ron Perry – Point guard 
 52 Sam Smith – Small forward 
 50 Skip Thoren – Center

Final standings

Eastern Division

Record vs. opponents

Playoffs
Eastern Division Semifinals

Muskies win series 3–2

Division Finals

Muskies lose series, 4–1

Awards and honors
1968 ABA All-Star Game selections (game played on January 9, 1968) 
 Mel Daniels 
 Donnie Freeman	 
 Les Hunter 
Jim Pollard was selected to coach the Eastern squad.

References

 Muskies on Basketball Reference

External links
 RememberTheABA.com 1967-68 regular season and playoff results
 RememberTheABA.com Minnesota Muskies page

Miami Floridians seasons
Minnesota
Kentucky Colonels, 1967-68
Kentucky Colonels, 1967-68